Lithobius is a large genus of centipedes in the family Lithobiidae, commonly called stone centipedes, common centipedes or brown centipedes.

Anatomy
Most Lithobius species are typical representatives of the family Lithobiidae. The adult's body has 18 segments, and 15 pairs of legs. The special characteristics include the dispersed openings of coxal glands of the last pair of legs.

Ecology
Stone centipedes are found under stones or bark, in soil and decaying matter. Some are common in gardens. Lithobius forficatus is the most abundant centipede species in Europe. Like other centipedes, they are more active at night. They feed on insects and other small invertebrates. The eggs are deposited singly in soil. The lifespan can be over 3 years.

Taxonomy
The genus Lithobius was erected in 1814 by William Elford Leach, in an article published in David Brewster's Edinburgh Encyclopædia. Leach did not designate a type species, and none was selected until Pierre André Latreille chose Scolopendra forficata Linnaeus, 1758 (now Lithobius forficatus). Lithobius is the name-giving genus for the family Lithobiidae.

Lithobius is one of about 100 genera or subgenera in the subfamily Lithobiinae. It contains over 500 species and numerous subspecies. The classification of species inside the genus is a matter of discussion too. Some authors divide the genus into subgenera Eulithobius, Lithobius, Monotarsobius, Neolithobius, Pleurolithobius, Pseudolithobius, Sigibius, Thracolithobius and Troglolithobius.

The genus Lithobius includes the following species:

Lithobius acherontis Verhoeff, 1900
Lithobius acipayamus Chamberlin, 1952
Lithobius adherens Chamberlin, 1952
Lithobius aidonensis Verhoeff, 1943
Lithobius allotiphlus (Silvestri, 1908)
Lithobius alpicosiensis Latzel, 1887
Lithobius alpinus Koch, 1862 non Matic & Darabantu, 1971
Lithobius altus Matic & Darabantu, 1971
Lithobius ameles Chamberlin, 1952
Lithobius angolianus Chamberlin, 1952
Lithobius anisanus Verhoeff, 1937
Lithobius ankarensis Verhoeff, 1944
Lithobius anodus Latzel, 1880
Lithobius antipai Matic, 1969
Lithobius aostanus Verhoeff, 1934
Lithobius apfelbecki Verhoeff, 1900
Lithobius ardesiacus Fedrizzi, 1877
Lithobius argaeensis Attems, 1905
Lithobius argus Newport, 1844
Lithobius armatus Selivanov, 1878
Lithobius asper Muralevitch, 1926
Lithobius athesinus Verhoeff, 1937
Lithobius atticus Verhoeff, 1901
Lithobius audax Meinert, 1872
Lithobius bartsiokasi Matic & Stavropoulos, 1990
Lithobius bebekensis (Verhoeff, 1944)
Lithobius berkeleyensis Verhoeff, 1937
Lithobius beroni Negrea, 1965
Lithobius biarmatus Matic, 1970
Lithobius bicolor Tömösvary, 1879
Lithobius bicuspidatus (Matic, 1957)
Lithobius bifidus Matic, 1973
Lithobius binaghii Manfredi, 1937
Lithobius biporus Silvestri, 1894
Lithobius boettgeri Verhoeff, 1925
Lithobius bolognai Zapparoli, 1991
Lithobius bonensis Meinert, 1872
Lithobius bosporanus (Verhoeff, 1941)
Lithobius brachycephalus Fanzago, 1880
Lithobius brevicornis Daday, 1889
Lithobius buakheriacus Zapparoli, 1985
Lithobius bulgaricus (Verhoeff, 1925)
Lithobius bullatus Eason, 1993
Lithobius burzenlandicus (Verhoeff, 1931)
Lithobius buxtoni Brölemann, 1924
Lithobius calabrensis Fedrizzi, 1878
Lithobius calamatanus (Verhoeff, 1899)
Lithobius canariensis Eason, 1992
Lithobius cantabrigensis Meinert
Lithobius capreae Verhoeff, 1943
Lithobius carmenae Matic, 1968
Lithobius cassinensis Verhoeff, 1925
Lithobius castaneus Newport, 1844
Lithobius cavernicola Fanzago, 1877
Lithobius cerberulus Verhoeff, 1941
Lithobius cerii Verhoeff, 1937
Lithobius chalusensis Matic, 1969
Lithobius chikerensis Verhoeff, 1936
Lithobius cinnamomenus Koch, 1862
Lithobius clarki Eason, 1975
Lithobius communis Koch, 1844
Lithobius consimilis Eason, 1992
Lithobius corcyraeus Verhoeff, 1899
Lithobius coriaceus Koch, 1862
Lithobius corrigendus Dobroruka, 1988
Lithobius crassipes Koch, 1862
Lithobius creticus Dobroruka, 1977
Lithobius crissolensis Verhoeff
Lithobius croaticus Matic & Teodoreanu, 1967
Lithobius cryptobius Silvestri, 1897
Lithobius curtipes Koch, 1847
Lithobius curtirostris Eisen & Stuxberg, 1868
Lithobius dacicus (Matic, 1959)
Lithobius dadayi Tömösvary, 1880
Lithobius dahlii Verhoeff, 1925
Lithobius degerboelae Eason, 1981 or 1986
Lithobius demavendicus Matic, 1969
Lithobius depressus Fanzago, 1880
Lithobius diana Verhoeff, 1901
Lithobius dieuzeidei Brölemann, 1931
Lithobius discolor Verhoeff, 1937
Lithobius doderoi Silvestri, 1908
Lithobius dolinophilus Verhoeff, 1937
Lithobius dollfusi Verhoeff, 1931
Lithobius domogledicus (Matic, 1961)
Lithobius doriae Pocock, 1890
Lithobius drescoi Demange, 1958
Lithobius dudichi Loksa, 1947
Lithobius easoni Matic, 1969
Lithobius elbanus Verhoeff, 1931
Lithobius elbursensis Matic, 1969
Lithobius electrinus (Verhoeff, 1937)
Lithobius electron Verhoeff, 1928
Lithobius electus Silvestri, 1935
Lithobius elegans Selivanov, 1931
Lithobius enghofi Eason, 1986
Lithobius ercijasius Verhoeff, 1943
Lithobius erdschiasius Verhoeff, 1943
Lithobius errantus Chamberlin, 1952
Lithobius eucuemis Stuxberg
Lithobius evae Dobroruka, 1958
Lithobius evasus (Chamberlin, 1952)
Lithobius excellens Silvestri, 1894
Lithobius exiguus Meinert, 1886
Lithobius eximius Meinert, 1872
Lithobius falteronensis Manfredi, 1936
Lithobius fangensis Eason, 1986
Lithobius fanzagoi Fedrizzi, 1877
Lithobius feae
Lithobius femorosulcatus Eason, 1986
Lithobius festivus Koch, 1862
Lithobius finitimus Fanzago, 1878
Lithobius flavus Meinert, 1872
Lithobius forficatus (Linnaeus, 1758)
Lithobius fossor Koch, 1862
Lithobius franzi Attems, 1949
Lithobius galatheae Meinert, 1886
Lithobius geyeri Verhoeff, 1935
Lithobius glabratus Koch, 1847
Lithobius glacialis Verhoeff, 1937
Lithobius gracilipes Meinert, 1872
Lithobius gracilis Meinert, 1872
Lithobius grandiporosus Verhoeff, 1937
Lithobius granulatus Koch, 1862
Lithobius gridellii Manfredi, 1955
Lithobius grossidens Meinert, 1872
Lithobius grossipes Koch, 1847
Lithobius haarlovi Eason, 1986
Lithobius hardwickei Newport, 1844
Lithobius hatayensis Verhoeff, 1943
Lithobius helvolus Attems, 1951
Lithobius herzegowinensis Verhoeff, 1900
Lithobius hispanicus Meinert, 1872
Lithobius hopanus (Chamberlin, 1952)
Lithobius hortensis Koch, 1862
Lithobius hummelii Verhoeff, 1933
Lithobius ilgazensis Matic, 1983
Lithobius immutabilis Koch, 1862
Lithobius imperialis Meinert, 1872
Lithobius inaequidens Fedrizzi, 1877
Lithobius incertus Matic, 1966
Lithobius indicus Eason, 1981
Lithobius inexpectatus Matic, 1962
Lithobius infossus Silvestri, 1894
Lithobius inopinatus Matic, 1970
Lithobius inquirendus Attems, 1951
Lithobius insignis Meinert, 1872
Lithobius ionicus (Silvestri, 1896)
Lithobius iranicus Attems, 1951
Lithobius italicus Matic, 1957
Lithobius javanicus Pocock, 1894
Lithobius kansuanus Verhoeff, 1933
Lithobius karamani Verhoeff, 1937
Lithobius kastamouensis Matic, 1983
Lithobius koenigi Verhoeff, 1891
Lithobius koreanus Verhoeff, 1938
Lithobius kosswigi Chamberlin, 1952
Lithobius kurdistanus Verhoeff, 1944
Lithobius laccatus Attems, 1951
Lithobius laevilabrum Leach, 1815
Lithobius lagrecai Matic, 1962
Lithobius lanzai Matic, 1961
Lithobius lapadensis Verhoeff, 1900
Lithobius latebricola Meinert, 1872
Lithobius latzellii Meinert
Lithobius lindbergi Chamberlin, 1956
Lithobius litoralis Koch, 1867
Lithobius lobifer (Chamberlin, 1952)
Lithobius loeiensis Eason, 1986
Lithobius lorioli Demange, 1962
Lithobius lubricus Koch, 1862
Lithobius lundii Meinert, 1886
Lithobius luteus Loksa, 1947
Lithobius macrocentrus Attems, 1949
Lithobius magnus (Trotzina, 1894)
Lithobius magurensis Dobroruka, 1971
Lithobius malaccanus Verhoeff, 1937
Lithobius malayicus Verhoeff, 1937
Lithobius marginatus Fedrizzi, 1877
Lithobius martensi Eason, 1989
Lithobius matici Prunescu, 1966
Lithobius matulicii Verhoeff, 1899
Lithobius maximovici Folkmanova, 1946
Lithobius mediolus Chamberlin, 1952
Lithobius megalaporus (Stuxberg, 1875)
Lithobius meifengensis Chao, Lee, Chang, 2018
Lithobius melanocephalus Koch, 1863
Lithobius memorabilis Attems, 1951
Lithobius meridionalis Fedrizzi, 1877
Lithobius micropodus Matic, 1983
Lithobius microps Meinert, 1868
Lithobius minellii Matic & Darabantu, 1971
Lithobius minimus Koch, 1862
Lithobius minutus Koch, 1847
Lithobius moananus (Chamberlin, 1926)
Lithobius moellensis Verhoeff, 1940
Lithobius molleri Verhoeff, 1893
Lithobius molophai Restivo de Miranda, 1978
Lithobius mongolicus Verhoeff, 1933
Lithobius montellicus Fanzago, 1874
Lithobius mordax Koch, 1862
Lithobius multidentatus Newport
Lithobius muscorum Koch, 1862
Lithobius nigrocullis Folkmanova, 1928
Lithobius nocellensis Verhoeff, 1943
Lithobius nodulipes Latzel, 1880
Lithobius nudicornis Gervais, 1837
Lithobius oblongus Sseliwanoff, 1881
Lithobius obscurus Meinert, 1872
Lithobius occultus Silvestri, 1894
Lithobius ocraceus Fedrizzi, 1878
Lithobius octops Menge, 1851
Lithobius oellatus Verhoeff, 1925
Lithobius oligoporus Latzel, 1885
Lithobius oraniensis Matic, 1967
Lithobius orientis (Chamberlin, 1952)
Lithobius orotavae Latzel, 1895
Lithobius pachypus Verhoeff, 1925
Lithobius paghmanensis Eason, 1986
Lithobius paidamus Chamberlin, 1952
Lithobius palmarum Verhoeff, 1934
Lithobius palnis (Eason, 1973)
Lithobius palustris Selivanov, 1878
Lithobius pantokratoris Attems, 1903
Lithobius paradisiacus Matic & Darabantu, 1971
Lithobius parisiensis Koch, 1862
Lithobius parvicornis (Porat, 1893)
Lithobius parvolus Fedrizzi, 1877
Lithobius patriarchalis (Berlese, 1894)
Lithobius paurus Chamberlin, 1952
Lithobius pedemontanus Matic & Darabantu, 1971
Lithobius peggauensis Verhoeff, 1937
Lithobius peregrinus Latzel, 1880
Lithobius persicus Pocock, 1899
Lithobius piceiavus Verhoeff, 1901
Lithobius pilatoi Matic, 1968
Lithobius pleonops Menge, 1851
Lithobius plesius (Chamberlin, 1952)
Lithobius plumbeus Manfredi, 1948
Lithobius politicus Chamberlin, 1952
Lithobius polyodontus Attems, 1951
Lithobius ponzianus Matic & Darabantu, 1969
Lithobius portchinski Sseliwanoff, 1881
Lithobius postspoliatus Verhoeff, 1942
Lithobius potanini Selivanov, 1881
Lithobius pseudoagilis Dobroruka, 1965
Lithobius pubescens Koch, 1867
Lithobius pulcher Meinert, 1872
Lithobius purkynei Dobroruka, 1957
Lithobius purpureus Chamberlin, 1901
Lithobius pustulatus Matic, 1964
Lithobius pygmaeus Latzel, 1880
Lithobius quadridentatus Menge, 1851
Lithobius rapax Meinert, 1872
Lithobius rapitus Chamberlin, 1952
Lithobius reiseri Verhoeff, 1900
Lithobius remyi Jawlowski, 1923
Lithobius rhaeticus Meinert, 1872
Lithobius rhiknus Attems, 1951
Lithobius riggioi Matic, 1968
Lithobius rilaicus Verhoeff, 1937
Lithobius ruffoi Matic, 1966
Lithobius rupivagus Verhoeff, 1937
Lithobius saalachiensis Verhoeff, 1937
Lithobius salernitanus Manfredi, 1956
Lithobius salicis Verhoeff, 1925
Lithobius sardous Silvestri, 1897
Lithobius sbordonii Matic, 1967
Lithobius scabrior Chamberlin, 1920
Lithobius schawalleri Eason, 1989
Lithobius scotophilus Latzel, 1887
Lithobius sculpturatus (Pocock, 1901)
Lithobius scutigeroides Verhoeff, 1892
Lithobius semperi Haase, 1887
Lithobius separatus Verhoeff, 1943
Lithobius serbicus Matic, 1979
Lithobius sibillinicus Matic, 1966
Lithobius sibiricus (Gerstfeldt, 1858)
Lithobius sicheli Matic, 1986
Lithobius silvivagus Verhoeff, 1925
Lithobius simrothi Verhoeff, 1937
Lithobius sitianus Chamberlin, 1956
Lithobius sloanei Koch, 1862
Lithobius socius Chamberlin, 1901
Lithobius songi Pei et al., 2011
Lithobius sordidus Koch, 1862
Lithobius speluncarum Fanzago, 1877
Lithobius sphinx (Verhoeff, 1941)
Lithobius stammeri Verhoeff, 1939
Lithobius subtilis Latzel, 1880
Lithobius suevicus Meinert, 1863
Lithobius sulcatus Koch, 1862
Lithobius sumatranus Silvestri, 1895
Lithobius svenhedini Verhoeff, 1933
Lithobius tahirensis Matic, 1983
Lithobius targionii Fanzago, 1874
Lithobius tatricus Dobroruka, 1958
Lithobius tauricus Selivanov, 1878
Lithobius temnensis Verhoeff, 1943
Lithobius tenuicornis Verhoeff, 1937
Lithobius tenuinguis Eason, 1980
Lithobius tetraspinus Pei, Lu, Liu, Hou, Ma, 2018
Lithobius terreus Fedrizzi, 1877
Lithobius thetidis Karsch, 1880
Lithobius tibiosetosus Eason, 1986
Lithobius tibiotenuis Eason, 1989
Lithobius tidissimus (Chamberlin, 1952)
Lithobius tiphlus (Latzel, 1886)
Lithobius transmarinus Koch, 1862
Lithobius trebinjanus (Verhoeff, 1900)
Lithobius tricuspis Meinert, 1872
Lithobius trilineatus Koch, 1862
Lithobius trinacrius Verhoeff, 1925
Lithobius turritanus Fanzago, 1881
Lithobius tweedii Verhoeff, 1937
Lithobius tylopus Latzel, 1882
Lithobius typhlus Latzel, 1886
Lithobius ulterior (Chamberlin, 1952)
Lithobius uludagensis Matic, 1983
Lithobius variegatus Leach, 1814
Lithobius varius Koch, 1863
Lithobius velox Koch, 1862
Lithobius venator Koch, 1862
Lithobius veronensis Matic & Darabantu, 1971
Lithobius viduus Attems
Lithobius vinciguerrae Silvestri, 1895
Lithobius vindelicius Verhoeff, 1935
Lithobius vinosus (Fanzago, 1874)
Lithobius violaceus Fedrizzi, 1877
Lithobius visicae Ribarov, 1987
Lithobius vorax Meinert, 1872
Lithobius vosseleri Verhoeff
Lithobius vulgaris Leach, 1817
Lithobius walachius Verhoeff, 1901
Lithobius weberi Pocock, 1894
Lithobius werneri Attems, 1902
Lithobius zachii Restivo de Miranda, 1978
Lithobius zeylanus (Chamberlin, 1952)

References

External links

Centipede genera
 
Taxa named by William Elford Leach